Luka Razmadze (born 30 December 1983) is a Georgian footballer who plays for FC Samgurali Tskhaltubo.

Razmadze made his Georgia debut on 11 October 2008. After this he has been called up for the national team for several times. Georgian Head Coach Was Hector Raul Couper.

External links

Footballers from Georgia (country)
Georgia (country) international footballers
Association football midfielders
1983 births
Living people
Erovnuli Liga players
Erovnuli Liga 2 players
FC WIT Georgia players
FC Metalurgi Rustavi players
FC Dila Gori players
FC Sioni Bolnisi players
FC Samgurali Tskaltubo players